Geoffrey Dickerson Golden (born April 26, 1994) is an American gospel musician. His music career started in 2014, with the appearance and victory on the gospel singing competition, Sunday Best. He released, a live album, Kingdom...LIVE!, with RCA Inspiration and Fo Yo Soul Recordings, in 2015. This album was his Billboard magazine breakthrough release.

Early life
Geoffrey Dickerson Golden was born on April 26, 1994, in Cleveland, Ohio, the son of a pastor, Eld. Kevin Dickerson Golden, at Glenville Church of Christ (Holiness) USA or COCHUSA, and his mother, Beverly Susan Golden (née, Moore), where he is the youngest, having two brothers and one sister. He graduated from Cleveland Heights High School, in 2012. He also directed the youth choir at East View United Church of Christ in Shaker Heights, Ohio. His collegiate musical career occurred in Atlanta, Georgia, at Morehouse College, where in 2016, he graduated.

Music career
His music recording career commenced in 2014, with the victory on Sunday Best, a gospel singing competition, occurring on BET, during season 7. He released, Kingdom...LIVE!', on August 7, 2015, with RCA Inspiration and Fo Yo Soul Recordings, and this album was recorded live in Irving, Texas at Irving Bible College, where it was hosted by Kirk Franklin. This live album was his breakthrough release upon the Billboard magazine charts, where it placed at No. 4 on the Top Gospel Albums chart. The single, "All of My Help", placed at No. 18 on the Gospel Digital Songs chart.

Discography

References

External links
 Facebook account

1994 births
Living people
African-American songwriters
African-American Christians
Musicians from Cleveland
Musicians from Atlanta
Songwriters from Ohio
Songwriters from Georgia (U.S. state)
21st-century African-American people